Kalareh may refer to:
 Kalareh-ye Mehrabi
 Kalareh-ye Zhaleh